Bethesda Presbyterian Church, Session House and Cemetery is a historic Presbyterian church, session house, and cemetery located in Chambersburg Township, Iredell County, North Carolina.  It was built in 1853, and is a one-story, three bay by five bay, rectangular vernacular Greek Revival style frame church.  It has a pedimented, temple form, front gable roof and an unusual front recessed balcony.  It is the oldest church building in Iredell County. Also on the property is the contributing session house, also built in 1853, and church cemetery with about 200 gravestones.

It was added to the National Register of Historic Places in 1980.

History
The Bethesda Presbyterian Church was organized on August 23, 1847 near Amity Hill in Iredell County.  The original fourteen members of the church had come from the Third Creek, Back Creek, Thyatira, and Fourth Creek Presbyterian churches in Iredell and Rowan Counties.  The first pastor in 1848 was the Rev. Thomas E. Davis.  Until the first building was built, the congregation met in brush arbors and a nearby school house.  The membership was 85 in 1855, including 46 white, 36 slave, and three free black members.  Initially, slaves and black members sat in the balcony of the church.  The church was still in use in 2022.

References

Presbyterian churches in North Carolina
Cemeteries in North Carolina
Churches on the National Register of Historic Places in North Carolina
Greek Revival church buildings in North Carolina
Churches completed in 1853
19th-century Presbyterian church buildings in the United States
Churches in Iredell County, North Carolina
National Register of Historic Places in Iredell County, North Carolina